The Pathans of Rajasthan are a Pathan/Pashtun community found in the state of Rajasthan in India.

History and origin
The community are descendants of Pashtun (Pathan) soldiers and adventurers who came to Rajasthan to serve in the armies of various Rajput princes. While the principality of Tonk was founded by Ameer Khan in 1817, a Yousafzai Pathan, and was the only non-Hindu state in Rajputana, and the community is sometimes referred to as the Tonkia Pathan.  Tonk was incorporated into the Indian Union in 1948. The failure of the 1857 Indian mutiny also led to an influx of Rohilla Pathans from the Rohilkhand region. Other than Tonk, they are also found in the districts of Dungarpur, Pratapgarh, Banswara, Ajmer, Jaipur, Bharatpur and Udaipur. They have three sub-divisions, the Swati, Buneri and Bagodi. Most of the Rajasthan Pathans belong to the Yousafzai tribe. They have long since abandoned Pashto, and now speak Hindustani, as well as various dialects of Rajasthani.

The traditional occupation of the Rajasthani Pathan was serving in the armed forces of the various states in Rajputana. Now many are employed by the state police, as government clerks, as well as in the transport industry. Some also land, especially in Tonk, and are a community of cultivators. They are entirely endogamous, very rarely marrying out of the community.

Each Pathan settlement has its own community council, known as a jamaat. The head of the jamaat was historically chosen from a locally prominent family, but is now elected. If the matters concerns the Pathan community as a whole, then members of the various local jamaats come together. The Rajasthani Pathan are entirely Sunni, and have been affected by the influence of the Tablighi Jamat, a reformist Deobandi organization, which is active in Rajasthan.

See also

Pashtun diaspora

References

Muslim communities of Rajasthan
Rajasthan
Social groups of Rajasthan